Kate Earl is the second album by American singer Kate Earl, released by Universal Republic as a digital download on August 18, 2009 and on CD on November 3, 2009. The first single released was "Melody."

Track listing
 "Nobody" — 3:26
 "Can't Treat Me That Way" — 3:18
 "Melody" — 3:52
 "Only in Dreams" — 4:04
 "All I Want" — 4:19
 "When You're Ready" — 4:10
 "Golden Street" — 3:53
 "Jump" — 3:08
 "Everlasting" — 4:06
 "Learning to Fly" — 4:09
 "Impossible" — 4:04
 "Nobody" (Acoustic) — 4:07 (iTunes bonus track)

Release history

References

External links
Kate Earl Official Site
Kate Earl Facebook
Kate Earl Twitter

2009 albums
Kate Earl albums
Universal Republic Records albums
Albums produced by Louis Biancaniello